Dienia ophrydis, commonly known as the common snout orchid or 无耳沼兰 (wu er zhao lan) is a plant in the orchid family and is native to endemic to a broad area of Asia, Southeast Asia, the Philippines, New Guinea and northern Australia. It is a deciduous, terrestrial orchid with a cone-shaped stem, bright green, wavy leaves and many greenish, brown, reddish or purplish flowers crowded on a wiry flowering stem.

Description
The petals are a linear in shape and similar in size to the sepals. Flowering occurs between December and April.

Taxonomy
The common snout orchid was first formally described in 1791 by Johann Gerhard König who gave it the name Epidendrum ophrydis and published the description in Observationes botanicae :sex fasciculis comprehensae. In 1997 Gunnar Seidenfaden changed the name to Dienia ophrydis. The specific epithet (ophrydis) is derived from the Ancient Greek word ophyrs meaning "brow" or "eyebrow".

Distribution and habitat
Dienia ophrydis grows in wet forests, often near streams and swampy areas. It is the most widespread species in the genus and is found in China, Cambodia, Bhutan, India, Japan, Laos, Malaysia, Myanmar, Nepal, the Philippines, Sri Lanka, Singapore, Thailand, Vietnam, New Guinea and northern Queensland.

References

External links 

ophrydis
Orchids of Asia
Orchids of New Guinea
Orchids of the Philippines
Orchids of Australia
Plants described in 1791